Mount Polley, originally Polley Mountain, elevation 1255 m (4117 feet), prominence 271 m, is a low mountain in the Cariboo region of the Central Interior of British Columbia, Canada. It is located just west of the foot of Quesnel Lake between Bootjack and Polley Lakes.  The site experienced a dam breach in 2014 at the Mount Polley mine which caused a spill of mine tailings into the nearby lake and creek.

Name origin
The name refers to a prospector who held placer leases in the area, a W. Polley.  It is presumed that he is a "Mr. Polley" identified in the 1887 edition of the BC Mines Report, who prospected in the Kangaroo Creek-Quesnel Forks area.

References

External links
BC Minfile Record Summary

Gold mines in British Columbia
Landforms of the Cariboo
One-thousanders of British Columbia